Barili, officially the Municipality of Barili,  is a 2nd class municipality in the province of Cebu, Philippines. According to the 2020 census, it has a population of 80,715 people.

History

The word barili comes from the name of a local grass called balili. The municipality was founded in 1632, though the parish of Barili was established in 1614. A cross was erected by conquistadores on their arrival at 1602, and still exists today.

It was in Barili that the Japanese forces captured Chief Justice José Abad Santos while on his way to Toledo as his escape route to Negros.

In 2006, the town became the first municipality in Cebu province to give protections to its heritage sites through Municipal Ordinance No. 04-06-01, s. 2006, declaring certain shrines, houses, buildings, monuments, markers and other areas as cultural properties of the municipality.

Geography
Barili is bordered to the north by the town of Aloguinsan, to the west is the Tañon Strait, to the east is the city of Carcar and the town of Sibonga, and to the south is the town of Dumanjug.

Barangays

Barili comprises 42 barangays:

Climate

Demographics

Economy

Barili is an agricultural town, and its economic output is more on food security. Farming and animal husbandry are the main livelihood of people residing in the town. They focus on rice and corn farming, animal husbandry such as hog, cattle and poultry, fruit farming and even vegetable gardening. Barili has its established Mantalongon Livestock Market where you can buy live animals which collectively come from Southern parts of Cebu and even from Negros Province. Barili is also known for its Japitan Fish Port. located in Barangay Japitan, 4–5 km away from its public market. Barangay Guiwanon of the same town is known for production of hand-weaved 'native hats made from leaves of the buri tree and other weaved native products.

Tourism

 are located close to the eastern end of the Carcar—Barili Road where it connects to the national highway. Pools at various heights flow into the basin. The waterfall is one of three main tourist attractions in the interior barangays of Barili.

Gallery

See also

List of Cultural Properties of the Philippines in Barili, Cebu

References

Sources

External links

 [ Philippine Standard Geographic Code]

Municipalities of Cebu